The Berryessa Union School District is a school district based in the Berryessa district of San Jose, California. It operates thirteen elementary schools (K-5) and three middle schools (6-8). The district's superintendent is Dr. Roxane Fuentes. The Berryessa schools have tended to improve over the last decade, with the top performer, Northwood Elementary School, having an API (Academic Performance Index) of 903 (out of 1000) as of fall 2008. In 2011, Vinci Park Elementary School had the largest API increase in district history, having a 48-point increase. Graduates from the middle schools (Morrill, Sierramont and Piedmont) normally attend Piedmont Hills High School or Independence High School. Notable students include Jerry Yang, who is the co-founder and former CEO of Yahoo!, who went to Sierramont. At Sierramont Middle School, Piedmont Middle School, and Morrill Middle School, there is also a Berryessa Chinese School. The district also has an American football team called the Berryessa Cougars.

Note: Based on 2002-2003 school year data

References

External links

School districts in San Jose, California